Sekhaenre Yakbim or Yakbmu was a ruler during the Second Intermediate Period of Egypt. Although his dynastic and temporal collocation is disputed, Danish Egyptologist Kim Ryholt believes that he likely was the founder of the Levantine-blooded Fourteenth Dynasty, while in older literature he was mainly considered a member of the Sixteenth Dynasty.

Identification
His name never appears inside a cartouche, which was a pharaonic prerogative; nevertheless, on his seals he is usually called "the good god, Sekhaenre" (or simply "Sekhaenre") and "the son of Ra, Yakbim".

There is no direct evidence that Yakbim's throne name was Sekhaenre. This theory is based on stylistic features of the seals and was proposed by William Ayres Ward and later elaborated on by Ryholt; Daphna Ben-Tor disputed this identification, pointing out that the seals of the several rulers living during this period are too similar to make such correlations on the basis of mere design features.

Assuming that Ward was right, Sekhaenre Yakbim is attested by a remarkable 123 seals, second only – for this period – to the 396 of Sheshi. Based on that, Ryholt estimated for him a reign length of around 25 years, in the interval 1805–1780 BCE.

Israeli Egyptologist Raphael Giveon identified Yakbim with another ruler of the same period, Ya'ammu Nubwoserre, while Jürgen von Beckerath equated Yakbim with Salitis, the Manethonian founder of the Fifteenth Dynasty.

References

Bibliography

External links

 Sekhaenre Yakbim on Digital Egypt

19th-century BC Pharaohs
18th-century BC Pharaohs
Pharaohs of the Fourteenth Dynasty of Egypt